Belbek is a village in Crimea. It is home to Sevastopol International Airport.

Villages in Crimea
Nakhimov District